Asclepiodotus may refer to:
 Asclepiodotus of Heraclea (fl. 2nd century BC), commander in the Macedonian army during the Third Macedonian War
 Asclepiodotus (philosopher) (fl. 1st century BC), philosopher, writer, and pupil of Posidonius
 Asclepiodotus of Lesbos (fl. 1st century BC), conspirator against Mithridates VI of Pontus
 Cassius Asclepiodotus (fl. 1st century AD), wealthy Bithynian exiled by Nero
 Julius Asclepiodotus (fl. 3rd century AD), Roman prefect and consul who served under Aurelian, Probus and Diocletian
 Asclepiodotus (consul 423)
 Asclepiodotus of Alexandria (fl. 5th century AD), Greek Neoplatonist philosopher
 Asclepiodotus (physician) (fl. 5th century AD), Greek physician
 King Asclepiodotus, mythical king in the time of Diocletian